Joyce Purnick is an American columnist and journalist.

Biography
Purnick was born on May 17, 1946 in New York City, the daughter of Charlotte Leah and Jacob "Jack" Purnick. In 1967, she graduated with a B.A. from Barnard College.

In 1970, she started her career as a news clerk with the New York Post eventually rising to chief political writer. In 1979, she accepted a position at The New York Times focusing on New York state, New York City government, and the New York City school system. In 1989, she served on the paper's editorial board as the paper's urban affairs analyst. In 1994, she wrote the twice weekly Metro Matters column covering local New York topics. In 1997, she was named deputy editor of the Metro department, the paper's largest section and the first woman to do so. In 1999, she returned to writing Metro Matters.

Awards
1996-97 Mike Berger Award from Columbia University's Graduate School of Journalism. 
1996 George Polk Award for metropolitan reporting for an exposé on the neglect of abused children by the city's welfare system 
1987 Peter Kihss Award for reporting on city government from the Fund for the City of New York
1979 Front Page Award from the Newswomen's Club of New York for political columns in New York magazine 
1975 from the Newspaper Guild and the Newswomen's Club of New York for feature writing at the New York Post

Books
Mike Bloomberg: Money, Power, Politics (2009)

Personal life
Purnick is married to writer and former New York Times executive editor, Max Frankel. She lives in Manhattan.

References

1946 births
Living people
American columnists
The New York Times people
The New York Times columnists
American women columnists
The New York Times editors
Barnard College alumni
21st-century American women